Herāt is an oasis city and the third-largest city of Afghanistan. In 2020, it had an estimated population of 574,276, and serves as the capital of Herat Province, situated south of the Paropamisus Mountains (Selseleh-ye Safēd Kōh) in the fertile valley of the Hari River in the western part of the country. An ancient civilization on the Silk Road between the Middle East, Central and South Asia, it serves as a regional hub in the country's west. 

Herat dates back to Avestan times and was traditionally known for its wine. The city has a number of historic sites, including the Herat Citadel and the Musalla Complex. During the Middle Ages Herat became one of the important cities of Khorasan, as it was known as the Pearl of Khorasan. After its conquest by Tamerlane, the city became an important center of intellectual and artistic life in the Islamic world. Under the rule of Shah Rukh, the city served as the focal point of the Timurid Renaissance, whose glory is thought to have matched Florence of the Italian Renaissance as the center of a cultural rebirth. After the fall of the Timurid Empire, Herat has been governed by various Afghan rulers since the early 18th century. In 1716, the Abdali Afghans inhabiting the city revolted and formed their own Sultanate, the Sadozai Sultanate of Herat. They were conquered by the Afsharids in 1732. After Nader Shah's death and Ahmad Shah Durrani's rise to power in 1747, Herat became part of Afghanistan. It became an independent city-state in the first half of the 19th century, facing several Iranian invasions until being incorporated into Afghanistan in 1863. The roads from Herat to Iran (through the border town of Islam Qala) and Turkmenistan (through the border town of Torghundi) are still strategically important. As the gateway to Iran, it collects high amount of customs revenue for Afghanistan. It also has an international airport. Following the 2001 war the city had been relatively safe from Taliban insurgent attacks. In 2021, it was announced that Herat would be listed as a UNESCO World Heritage Site. On 12 August 2021, the city was seized by Taliban fighters as part of the Taliban's summer offensive.

History

Herat is first recorded in ancient times, but its precise date of foundation is unknown. Under the Persian Achaemenid Empire (550–330 BC), the surrounding district was known by the Old Persian name of Haraiva (𐏃𐎼𐎡𐎺), and in classical sources, the region was correspondingly known as Areia (Aria). In the Zoroastrian collection of Avesta, the district is referred as Haroiva. Herey is mentioned in Sanskrit as a yellow or golden color equivalent to Persian "Zard" meaning Gold (yellow). The naming of a region and its principal town after the main river is a common feature in this part of the world— compare the adjoining districts/rivers/towns of Arachosia and Bactria.

The district Aria of the Achaemenid Empire is mentioned in the provincial lists that are included in various royal inscriptions, for instance, in the Behistun inscription of Darius I (ca. 520 BC). Representatives from the district are depicted in reliefs, e.g., at the royal Achaemenid tombs of Naqsh-e Rustam and Persepolis. They are wearing Scythian-style dress (with a tunic and trousers tucked into high boots) and a twisted Bashlyk that covers their head, chin and neck.

Hamdallah Mustawfi, composer of the 14th-century geographical work Nuzhat al-Qulub writes that:

Herodotus described Herat as the bread-basket of Central Asia. At the time of Alexander the Great in 330 BC, Aria was obviously an important district. It was administered by a satrap called Satibarzanes, who was one of the three main Persian officials in the East of the Empire, together with the satrap Bessus of Bactria and Barsaentes of Arachosia. In late 330 BC, Alexander captured the Arian capital that was called Artacoana. The town was rebuilt and the citadel was constructed. Afghanistan became part of the Seleucid Empire.

However, most sources suggest that Herat was predominantly Zoroastrian. It became part of the Parthian Empire in 167 BC. In the Sasanian period (226-652), 𐭧𐭥𐭩𐭥 Harēv is listed in an inscription on the Ka'ba-i Zartosht at Naqsh-e Rustam; and Hariy is mentioned in the Pahlavi catalogue of the provincial capitals of the empire. In around 430, the town is also listed as having a Christian community, with a Nestorian bishop.

In the last two centuries of Sasanian rule, Aria (Herat) had great strategic importance in the endless wars between the Sasanians, the Chionites and the Hephthalites who had been settled in the northern section of Afghanistan since the late 4th century.

Islamization

At the time of the Arab invasion in the middle of the 7th century, the Sasanian central power seemed already largely nominal in the province in contrast with the role of the Hephthalites tribal lords, who were settled in the Herat region and in the neighboring districts, mainly in pastoral Bādghis and in Qohestān. It must be underlined, however, that Herat remained one of the three Sasanian mint centers in the east, the other two beings Balkh and Marv. The Hephthalites from Herat and some unidentified Turks opposed the Arab forces in a battle of Qohestān in 651-52 AD, trying to block their advance on Nishāpur, but they were defeated

When the Arab armies appeared in Khorāsān in the 650s AD, Herāt was counted among the twelve capital towns of the Sasanian Empire. The Arab army under the general command of Ahnaf ibn Qais in its conquest of Khorāsān in 652 seems to have avoided Herāt, but it can be assumed that the city eventually submitted to the Arabs, since shortly afterward an Arab governor is mentioned there. A treaty was drawn in which the regions of Bādghis and Bushanj were included. As did many other places in Khorāsān, Herāt rebelled and had to be re-conquered several times.

Another power that was active in the area in the 650s was Tang dynasty China which had embarked on a campaign that culminated in the Conquest of the Western Turks. By 659–661, the Tang claimed a tenuous suzerainty over Herat, the westernmost point of Chinese power in its long history. This hold however would be ephemeral with local Turkish tribes rising in rebellion in 665 and driving out the Tang.

In 702 AD Yazid ibn al-Muhallab defeated certain Arab rebels, followers of Ibn al-Ash'ath, and forced them out of Herat. The city was the scene of conflicts between different groups of Muslims and Arab tribes in the disorders leading to the establishment of the Abbasid Caliphate. Herat was also a center of the followers of Ustadh Sis.

In 870 AD, Yaqub ibn Layth Saffari, a local ruler of the Saffarid dynasty conquered Herat and the rest of the nearby regions in the name of Islam.

Pearl of Khorasan

The region of Herāt was under the rule of King Nuh III, the seventh of the Samanid line—at the time of Sebük Tigin and his older son, Mahmud of Ghazni. The governor of Herāt was a noble by the name of Faik, who was appointed by Nuh III. It is said that Faik was a powerful, but insubordinate governor of Nuh III, and had been punished by Nuh III. Faik made overtures to Bogra Khan and Ughar Khan of Khorasan. Bogra Khan answered Faik's call, came to Herāt, and became its ruler. The Samanids fled, betrayed at the hands of Faik to whom the defense of Herāt had been entrusted by Nuh III. In 994, Nuh III invited Alptegin to come to his aid. Alptegin, along with Mahmud of Ghazni, defeated Faik and annexed Herāt, Nishapur and Tous.

Herat was a great trading center strategically located on trade routes from Mediterranean to India or to China. The city was noted for its textiles during the Abbasid Caliphate, according to many references by geographers. Herāt also had many learned sons such as Ansārī. The city is described by Estakhri and Ibn Hawqal in the 10th century as a prosperous town surrounded by strong walls with plenty of water sources, extensive suburbs, an inner citadel, a congregational mosque, and four gates, each gate opening to a thriving market place. The government building was outside the city at a distance of about a mile in a place called Khorāsānābād. A church was still visible in the countryside northeast of the town on the road to Balkh, and farther away on a hilltop stood a flourishing fire temple, called Sereshk, or Arshak according to Mustawfi.

Herat was a part of the Taherid dominion in Khorāsān until the rise of the Saffarids in Sistān under Ya'qub-i Laith in 861, who, in 862, started launching raids on Herat before besieging and capturing it on 16 August 867, and again in 872. The Saffarids succeeded in expelling the Taherids from Khorasan in 873.

The Sāmānid dynasty was established in Transoxiana by three brothers, Nuh, Yahyā, and Ahmad. Ahmad Sāmāni opened the way for the Samanid dynasty to the conquest of Khorāsān, including Herāt, which they were to rule for one century. The centralized Samanid administration served as a model for later dynasties. The Samanid power was destroyed in 999 by the Qarakhanids, who were advancing on Transoxiana from the northeast, and by the Ghaznavids, former Samanid retainers, attacking from the southeast.

Sultan Maḥmud of Ghazni officially took control of Khorāsān in 998. Herat was one of the six Ghaznavid mints in the region. In 1040, Herat was captured by the Seljuk Empire. During this change of power in Herat, there was supposedly a power vacuum which was filled by Abdullah Awn, who established a city-state and made an alliance with Mahmud of Ghazni. Yet, in 1175, it was captured by the Ghurids of Ghor and then came under the Khawarazm Empire in 1214. According to the account of Mustawfi, Herat flourished especially under the Ghurid dynasty in the 12th century. Mustawfi reported that there were "359 colleges in Herat, 12,000 shops all fully occupied, 6,000 bath-houses; besides caravanserais and mills, also a darwish convent and a fire temple". There were about 444,000 houses occupied by a settled population. The men were described as "warlike and carry arms", and they were Sunni Muslims. The great mosque of Herāt was built by Ghiyasuddin Ghori in 1201. In this period Herāt became an important center for the production of metal goods, especially in bronze, often decorated with elaborate inlays in precious metals.

The Mongols laid siege to Herat twice. The first siege resulted in the surrender of the city, the slaughter of the local sultan's army of 12,000, and the appointment of two governors, one Mongol and one Muslim. The second, prompted by a rebellion against Mongol rule, lasted seven months and ended in June 1222 with, according to one account, the beheading of the entire population of 1,600,000 people by the victorious Mongols, such that "no head was left on a body, nor body with a head." 

The city remained in ruins from 1222 to about 1236. In 1244, a local prince Shams al-Din Kart was named ruler of Herāt by the Mongol governor of Khorāsān and in 1255 he was confirmed in his rule by the founder of the Il-Khan dynasty Hulagu. Shamsuddin Kart founded a new dynasty and his successors, especially Fakhruddin Kart and Ghiyasuddin Kart, built many mosques and other buildings. The members of this dynasty were great patrons of literature and the arts. By this time Herāt became known as the pearl of Khorasan.

Timur took Herat in 1380 and he brought the Kartid dynasty to an end a few years later. The city reached its greatest glory under the Timurid princes, especially Sultan Husayn Bayqara who ruled Herat from 1469 until May 4, 1506. His chief minister, the poet and author in Persian and Turkish, Mir Ali-Shir Nava'i was a great builder and patron of the arts. Under the Timurids, Herat assumed the role of the main capital of an empire that extended in the West as far as central Persia. As the capital of the Timurid empire, it boasted many fine religious buildings and was famous for its sumptuous court life and musical performance and its tradition of miniature paintings. On the whole, the period was one of relative stability, prosperity, and development of economy and cultural activities. It began with the nomination of Shahrokh, the youngest son of Timur, as governor of Herat in 1397. The reign of Shahrokh in Herat was marked by intense royal patronage, building activities, and the promotion of manufacturing and trade, especially through the restoration and enlargement of the Herat's bāzār. The present Musallah Complex, and many buildings such as the madrasa of Gawhar Shad, Ali Shir mahāl, many gardens, and others, date from this time. The village of Gazar Gah, over two km northeast of Herat, contained a shrine that was enlarged and embellished under the Timurids. The tomb of the poet and mystic Khwājah Abdullāh Ansārī (d. 1088), was first rebuilt by Shahrokh about 1425, and other famous men were buried in the shrine area.

In the summer of 1458, the Qara Qoyunlu under Jahan Shah advanced as far as Herat, but had to turn back soon because of a revolt by his son Hasan Ali and also because Abu Said's march on Tabriz.

In 1507, Herat was occupied by the Uzbeks but after much fighting the city was taken by Shah Isma'il, the founder of the Safavid dynasty, in 1510 and the Shamlu Qizilbash assumed the governorship of the area. Under the Safavids, Herat was again relegated to the position of a provincial capital, albeit one of particular importance. At the death of Shah Isma'il the Uzbeks again took Herat and held it until Shah Tahmasp retook it in 1528. The Persian king, Abbas was born in Herat, and in Safavid texts, Herat is referred to as a'zam-i bilād-i īrān, meaning "the greatest of the cities of Iran". In the 16th century, all future Safavid rulers, from Tahmasp I to Abbas I, were governors of Herat in their youth.

Modern history

By the early 18th century Herat was governed by the Abdali Afghans. After Nader Shah's death in 1747, Ahmad Shah Durrani took possession of the city and became part of the Durrani Empire.

In 1793, Herat became independent for several years when Afghanistan underwent a civil war between different sons of Timur Shah. The Iranians had multiple wars with Herat between 1801 and 1837 (1804, 1807, 1811, 1814, 1817, 1818, 1821, 1822, 1825, 1833). The Iranians besieged the city in 1837, but the British helped the Heratis in repelling them. In 1856, they invaded again, and briefly managed to take the city on October 25; it led directly to the Anglo-Persian War. In 1857 hostilities between the Iranians and the British ended after the Treaty of Paris was signed, and the Persian troops withdrew from Herat in September 1857. Afghanistan conquered Herat on May 26, 1863, under Dost Muhammad Khan, two weeks before his death.

The famous Musalla of Gawhar Shah of Herat, a large Islamic religious complex consisting of five minarets, several mausoleums along with mosques and madrasas was dynamited during the Panjdeh incident to prevent their usage by the advancing Russian forces. Some emergency preservation work was carried out at the site in 2001 which included building protective walls around the Gawhar Shad Mausoleum and Sultan Husain Madrasa, repairing the remaining minaret of Gawhar Shad's Madrasa, and replanting the mausoleum garden.

In the 1960s, engineers from the United States built Herat Airport, which was used by the Soviet forces during the Democratic Republic of Afghanistan in the 1980s. Even before the Soviet invasion at the end of 1979, there was a substantial presence of Soviet advisors in the city with their families.

Between March 10 and March 20, 1979, the Afghan Army in Herāt under the control of commander Ismail Khan mutinied. Thousands of protesters took to the streets against the Khalq communist regime's oppression led by Nur Mohammad Taraki. The new rebels led by Khan managed to oust the communists and take control of the city for 3 days, with some protesters murdering any Soviet advisers. This shocked the government, who blamed the new administration of Iran following the Iranian Revolution for influencing the uprising. Reprisals by the government followed, and between 3,000 and 24,000 people (according to different sources) were killed, in what is called the 1979 Herat uprising, or in Persian as the Qiam-e Herat. The city itself was recaptured with tanks and airborne forces, but at the cost of thousands of civilians killed. This massacre was the first of its kind since the Third Anglo-Afghan War in 1919, and was the bloodiest event preceding the Soviet–Afghan War.

Herat received damage during the Soviet–Afghan War in the 1980s, especially its western side. The province as a whole was one of the worst-hit. In April 1983, a series of Soviet bombings damaged half of the city and killed around 3,000 civilians, described as "extremely heavy, brutal and prolonged". Ismail Khan was the leading mujahideen commander in Herāt fighting against the Soviet-backed government.

After the communist government's collapse in 1992, Khan joined the new government and he became governor of Herat Province. The city was relatively safe and it was recovering and rebuilding from the damage caused in the Soviet–Afghan War. However, on September 5, 1995, the city was captured by the Taliban without much resistance, forcing Khan to flee. Herat became the first Persian-speaking city to be captured by the Taliban. The Taliban's strict enforcement of laws confining women at home and closing girls' schools alienated Heratis who are traditionally more liberal and educated, like the Kabulis, than other urban populations in the country. Two days of anti-Taliban protests occurred in December 1996 which was violently dispersed and led to the imposition of a curfew. In May 1999, a rebellion in Herat was crushed by the Taliban, who blamed Iran for causing it.

After the U.S. invasion of Afghanistan, on November 12, 2001, it was captured from the Taliban by forces loyal to the Northern Alliance and Ismail Khan returned to power (see Battle of Herat). The state of the city was reportedly much better than that of Kabul. In 2004, Mirwais Sadiq, Aviation Minister of Afghanistan and the son of Ismail Khan, was ambushed and killed in Herāt by a local rival group. More than 200 people were arrested under suspicion of involvement.

In 2005, the International Security Assistance Force (ISAF) began establishing bases in and around the city. Its main mission was to train the Afghan National Security Forces (ANSF) and help with the rebuilding process of the country. Regional Command West, led by Italy, assisted the Afghan National Army (ANA) 207th Corps. Herat was one of the first seven areas that transitioned security responsibility from NATO to Afghanistan. In July 2011, the Afghan security forces assumed security responsibility from NATO.

Due to their close relations, Iran began investing in the development of Herat's power, economy and education sectors. In the meantime, the United States built a consulate in Herat to help further strengthen its relations with Afghanistan. In addition to the usual services, the consulate works with the local officials on development projects and with security issues in the region.

On 12 August 2021, the city was captured by the Taliban during the 2021 Taliban offensive.

Geography

Climate 
Herat has a cold semi-arid climate (Köppen climate classification BSk). Precipitation is very low, and mostly falls in winter. Although Herāt is approximately  lower than Kandahar, the summer climate is more temperate, and the climate throughout the year is far from disagreeable, although winter temperatures are comparably lower. From May to September, the wind blows from the northwest with great force. The winter is tolerably mild; snow melts rather quickly, and even on the mountains does not lie long. The eastern reaches of the Hari River, including the rapids, are frozen hard in the winter, and people travel on it as on a road.

Places of interest
Foreign consulates
India, Iran and Pakistan operate their consulate here for trade, military and political links.

Neighborhoods
Shahr-e Naw (Downtown)
Welayat (Office of the governor)
Qol-Ordue (Army's HQ)
Farqa (Army's HQ)
Darwaze Khosh
Chaharsu
Pul-e Rangine
Sufi-abad
New-abad
Pul-e malaan
Thakhte Safar
Howz-e-Karbas
Baramaan
Darwaze-ye Qandahar
Darwaze-ye Iraq
Darwaze Az Kordestan

Parks
Park-e Taraki
Park-e Millat
Khane-ye Jihad Park
Monuments
Herat Citadel (Qala Ikhtyaruddin or Arg)
Musallah Complex
Musalla Minarets of Herat
Of the more than dozen minarets that once stood in Herāt, many have been toppled from war and neglect over the past century. Recently, however, everyday traffic threatens many of the remaining unique towers by shaking the very foundations they stand on.  Cars and trucks that drive on a road encircling the ancient city rumble the ground every time they pass these historic structures. UNESCO personnel and Afghan authorities have been working to stabilize the Fifth Minaret.

Museums
Herat Museum, located inside the Herat Citadel
Jihad Museum
Mausoleums and tombs
Gawhar Shad Mausoleum
Mausoleum of Khwajah Abdullah Ansari
Tomb of Jami
Tomb of khaje Qaltan
Mausoleum of Mirwais Sadiq
Jewish cemetery – there once existed an ancient Jewish community in the city. Its remnants are a cemetery and a ruined shrine.
Mosques
Jumu'ah Mosque (Friday Mosque of Herat)
Gazargah Sharif
Khalghe Sharif
Shah Zahdahe
Hotels
Serena Hotel (coming soon)
Diamond Hotel
Marcopolo Hotel
Stadiums
Herat Stadium
Universities
Herat University

Demography

The population of Herat numbered approximately 592,902 in 2021. The city houses a multi-ethnic society and speakers of the Persian language are in the majority. There is no current data on the precise ethnic composition of the city's population, but according to a 2003 map found in the National Geographic Magazine, Persian-speaking Tajik and Farsiwan peoples form the majority of the city, comprising around 85% of the population. The remaining population comprises Pashtuns (10%), Hazaras (2%), Uzbeks (2%) and Turkmens (1%).

Persian is the native language of Herat and the local dialect – known by natives as Herātī – belongs to the Khorāsānī cluster within Persian. It is akin to the Persian dialects of eastern Iran, notably those of Mashhad and Khorasan Province, which borders Herat. This Persian dialect serves as the lingua franca of the city. The second language that is understood by many is Pashto, which is the native language of the Pashtuns. The local Pashto dialect spoken in Herat is a variant of western Pashto, which is also spoken in Kandahar and southern and western Afghanistan. Religiously, Sunni Islam is practiced by the majority, while Shias make up the minority.

The city has high residential density clustered around the core of the city. However, vacant plots account for a higher percentage of the city (21%) than residential land use (18%) and agricultural is the largest percentage of total land use (36%).

The city once had a Jewish community. About 280 families lived in Herat as of 1948, but most of them moved to Israel that year, and the community disappeared by 1992. There are four former synagogues in the city's old quarter, which were neglected for decades and fell into disrepair. In the late 2000s, the buildings of the synagogues were renovated by the Aga Khan Trust for culture, and at this time, three of them were turned into schools and nurseries, the Jewish community having vanished. The Jewish cemetery is being taken care of by Jalil Ahmed Abdelaziz.

Sports 
Professional sports teams from Herat

 Stadiums
 Herat Cricket Ground
 Herat Stadium

Notable people from Herat

Rulers and emperors 

 Tahir ibn Husayn 9th century Abbasid Caliphate army general, and the founder of Tahirid dynasty
 Ghiyasuddin Muhammad, was the emperor of the Ghurid dynasty from 1163 to 1202. During his reign, the Ghurid dynasty became a world power, which stretched from Gorgan to Bengal
 Mīrzā Shāhrūkh bin Tīmur Barlas, Emperor of the Timurid dynasty of Herāt
 Abu Sa'id Mirza, ruler of the Timurid Empire during the mid-fifteenth century
 Mīrzā Husseyn Bāyqarāh, Emperor of the Timurid dynasty of Herāt
 Shāh Abbās The Great, Emperor of Safavid Persia
 Ahmad Shah Durrani, founder of the Durrani Empire 
 Emir Dost Mohammad Khan, founder of the Barakzai dynasty, buried in the city
 Sultan Jan, ruler of Herat in the 19th century

Politicians 

 Ahmad Maymandi 11th century Persian vizier of the Ghaznavid empire
 Ismail Khan, former governor of Herat Province and Minister of Water and Energy
 Amena Afzali, politician
 Faramarz Tamanna, politician

Poets 

 Asjadi, 10th-11th century royal Persian poet at the court of the Ghaznavids
 Khwājah Abdullāh al-Herawi al-Ansārī, a Persian poet of the 11th century
Pur-Baha Jami, 13th century Iranian poet, Pun master, satirist, and often scathing social commentator, born in Jam, spent his youth in Herat
 Nūr ud-Dīn Jāmī, a Persian Sufi poet of the 15th century
 Nizām ud-Din ʿAlī Shīr Herawi, famous poet and scientist of the Timurid era
 Hatefi, a Persian poet of the 16th century and nephew of Nūr ud-Dīn Jāmī
 Latif Nazemi, Persian poet
 Nadia Anjuman (1981-2005) poet writing in Dari

Scientists 

 Abu Mansur Muvaffak Harawi, 10th-century Persian physician
 Abolfadl Harawi, 10th-century astronomer under the patroange of the Buyids in Rey, originally from Herat
Ahmad ibn Farrokh, 12th-century Persian physician
 Taftazani, a Muslim polymath of the 14th century
 Muhammad ibn Yusuf al-Harawi 15th century Persian physician
 Nimat Allah al-Harawi 17th century Persian chronicler at the court of the Mughal Emperor Jahangir

Religious figures 

 Fakhr ad-Din al-Razi, polymath and Islamic scholar of the 12th-century
 Hussain Kashefi, a 15th-century Persian prose-stylist and Islamic scholar and scientist
 Ali al-Hirawi al-Qari, from 17th century, considered to be one of the masters of hadith and Imams of fiqh
 Mujib Rahman Ansari (1982–2022), mullah and pro-Taliban cleric

Artists 

 Ali ibn Abi Bakr al-Harawi 12th and 13th century Persian traveller and first known graffiti artist in the Muslim world, originally from Herat
 Ustād Kamāl ud-Dīn Behzād, the greatest of the medieval Persian painters
 Mir Ali Heravi, prominent Persian calligrapher and calligraphy teacher of Nastaʿlīq script in the 16th century
 Alka Sadat, Film producer was born here
 Sonita Alizadeh, rapper and activist

Sports 

 Nadia Nadim, Afghan-Danish football player, most influential and greatest Afghan female football player of all time, won the French league title in the 2020-21 season with Paris Saint-Germain
 Hamidullah Karimi, Afghan footballer, plays as a forward for Indian club Delhi United FC
Mohammad Rafi Barekzay, Afghan footballer, plays as a midfielder for Toofaan Harirod F.C

Others 

 Gowhar Shad, wife of Shāh Rūkh Mīrzā
 Zablon Simintov, last remaining Jew living in Afghanistan

Economy and infrastructure

Transport

Air

Herat International Airport was built by engineers from the United States in the 1960s and was used by the Soviet Armed Forces during the Soviet–Afghan War in the 1980s. It was bombed in late 2001 during Operation Enduring Freedom but had been rebuilt within the next decade. The runway of the airport has been extended and upgraded and as of August 2014 there were regularly scheduled direct flights to Delhi, Dubai, Mashad, and various airports in Afghanistan. At least five airlines operated regularly scheduled direct flights to Kabul.

Rail

Rail connections to and from Herat were proposed many times, during The Great Game of the 19th century and again in the 1970s and 1980s, but nothing came to life. In February 2002, Iran and the Asian Development Bank announced funding for a railway connecting Torbat-e Heydarieh in Iran to Herat. This was later changed to begin in Khaf in Iran, a  railway for both cargo and passengers, with work on the Iranian side of the border starting in 2006. Construction is underway in the Afghan side and it was estimated to be completed by March 2018. There is also the prospect of an extension across Afghanistan to Sher Khan Bandar.

Road
The AH76 highway connects Herat to Maymana and the north. The AH77 connects it east towards Chaghcharan and north towards Mary in Turkmenistan. Highway 1 (part of Asian highway AH1) links it to Mashhad in Iran to the northwest, and south via the Kandahar–Herat Highway to Delaram.

Gallery

Herat in fiction
The beginning of Khaled Hosseini's 2007 novel A Thousand Splendid Suns is set in and around Herāt.
Salman Rushdie's novel The Enchantress of Florence makes frequent reference to events in Herāt in the Middle Ages.

Sister cities
 Council Bluffs, Iowa, United States (since 2016)

 Divandarreh, Kurdistan, Iran (since 2021)

See also

Aria (satrapy)
Geography of Afghanistan
Greater Khorasan
Herāt Province
History of Afghanistan

References

Sources

Attribution

Bibliography

External links

Detailed map of Herāt city
Map of Herāt and surroundings in 1942, Perry–Castañeda Library Map Collection, University of Texas at Austin

 
 

 
Cities in Afghanistan
Cities in Central Asia
Populated places along the Silk Road
Populated places in Herat Province
Provincial capitals in Afghanistan
Cities founded by Alexander the Great